Jens Adams (born 5 June 1992) is a Belgian cyclo-cross and road cyclist.

Major results

Cyclo-cross

2009–2010
 1st Junior Namur
2012–2013
 Under-23 Superprestige
2nd Ruddervoorde
2nd Zonhoven
2nd Gavere
2nd Gieten
 Under-23 Bpost Bank Trophy
3rd Koppenberg
2013–2014
 1st  National Under-23 Championships
 Under-23 Superprestige
2nd Gavere
2016–2017
 1st Illnau
 DVV Trophy
2nd Ronse
 Soudal Classics
2nd Neerpelt
 Toi Toi Cup
3rd Tábor
2017–2018
 Soudal Classics
3rd Neerpelt
2018–2019
 Soudal Classics
2nd Hasselt
 2nd Bensheim
 Brico Cross
3rd Bredene
2019–2020
 3rd Zonnebeke
2020–2021
 3rd Gullegem
2021–2022
 2nd Oostmalle
 X²O Badkamers Trophy
3rd Brussels
2022–2023
 Exact Cross
2nd Essen
 2nd Oisterwijk

Road

2009
 2nd Overall Oberösterreich Juniorenrundfahrt
2010
 3rd Remouchamps–Ferrières–Remouchamps
 4th Overall Tour du Valromey
 4th Overall Niedersachsen-Rundfahrt
2015
 1st Overall Tour de Namur
1st Stages 3 & 4
2018
 4th Heistse Pijl
 8th Grote Prijs Marcel Kint

References

External links

1992 births
Living people
Belgian male cyclists
Cyclo-cross cyclists
Sportspeople from Turnhout
Cyclists from Antwerp Province
21st-century Belgian people